The Badshahi Mosque (Urdu,; literally The Royal Mosque) is a Mughal-era congregational mosque in Lahore, capital of the Pakistani province of Punjab. The mosque is located west of Lahore Fort along the outskirts of the Walled City of Lahore, and is widely considered to be one of Lahore's most iconic landmarks.

The Badshahi Mosque was constructed by the Mughal emperor Aurangzeb between 1671 and 1673 and was the largest mosque in the world from 1673 to 1986. The mosque is an important example of Mughal architecture, with an exterior that is decorated with carved red sandstone with marble inlay. It remains the largest mosque of the Mughal-era, and is the third-largest mosque in Pakistan. In 1799, during the rule of Ranjit Singh of the Sikh Empire, the mosque's courtyard was used as a stable and its hujras (cells) as soldiers quarters. When the British Empire took control of Lahore in 1846 it was used as a garrison until 1852. Subsequently the Badshahi Mosque Authority was established to oversee its restoration as a place of worship. It is now one of Pakistan's most iconic sights.

History
The sixth Mughal emperor, Aurangzeb, chose Lahore as the site for his new imperial mosque. Aurangzeb, unlike the previous emperors, was not a major patron of art and architecture and instead focused, during much of his reign, on various military conquests which added over 3 million square kilometres to the Mughal realm. The mosque was built to commemorate Aurangzeb's military campaigns in southern India, in particular against the Maratha king Shivaji. As a symbol of the mosque's importance, it was built directly across from the Lahore Fort and its Alamgiri Gate, which was concurrently built by Aurangzeb during construction of the mosque.

The mosque was commissioned in 1671, with construction overseen by the Emperor's foster brother, and Governor of Lahore, Muzaffar Hussein - also known by the name Fidai Khan Koka. After only two years of construction, the mosque was opened in 1673.

Sikh era

On 7 July 1799, the Sikh army of Ranjit Singh took control of Lahore. After the capture of the city, Maharaja Ranjit Singh used its vast courtyard as a stable for his army horses, and its 80 Hujras (small study rooms surrounding the courtyard) as quarters for his soldiers and as magazines for military stores. In 1818, he built a marble edifice in the Hazuri Bagh facing the mosque, known as the Hazuri Bagh Baradari, which he used as his official royal court of audience. Marble slabs for the baradari may have been plundered by the Sikhs from other monuments in Lahore. In 1839, after his death, construction of a samadhi in his memory was begun by his son and successor, Kharak Singh, at a site adjacent to the mosque.

During the First Anglo-Sikh War in 1841, Ranjit Singh's son, Sher Singh, used the mosque's large minarets for placement of zamburahs or light guns which were used to bombard the supporters of Chand Kaur, who had taken refuge in the besieged Lahore Fort. In one of these bombardments, the fort's Diwan-e-Aam (Hall of Public Audience) was destroyed, but was subsequently rebuilt in the British era. During this time, Henri de La Rouche, a French cavalry officer employed in the army of Sher Singh, also used a tunnel connecting the Badshahi mosque to the Lahore fort to temporarily store gunpowder.

British Rule
In 1849 the British seized control of Lahore from the Sikh Empire. During the British Raj, the mosque and the adjoining fort continued to be used as a military garrison. The 80 cells built into the walls surrounding its vast courtyard were demolished by the British after the Indian Rebellion of 1857, so as to prevent them from being used for anti-British activities. The cells were replaced by open arcades known as dalans.

Because of increasing Muslim resentment against the use of the mosque as a military garrison, the British set up the Badshahi Mosque Authority in 1852 to oversee the restoration and to re-establish it as a place of religious worship. From then onwards, piecemeal repairs were carried out under the supervision of the Badshahi Mosque Authority. The building was officially handed back to the Muslim community by John Lawrence, who was the Viceroy of India. The building was then re-established as a mosque.

In April 1919, after the Amritsar Massacre, a mixed Sikh, Hindu and Muslim crowd of an estimated 25,000-35,000 gathered in the mosque's courtyard in protest. A speech by Gandhi was read at the event by Khalifa Shuja-ud-Din, who would later become Speaker of the Provincial Assembly of the Punjab.

Extensive repairs commenced from 1939 onwards, when Sikandar Hayat Khan began raising funds for this purpose. Renovation was supervised by the architect Nawab Alam Yar Jung Bahadur. As Khan was largely credited for extensive restorations to the mosque, he was buried adjacent to the mosque in the Hazuri Bagh.

Post-independence 

Restoration works begun in 1939 continued after the Independence of Pakistan, and were completed in 1960 at a total cost of 4.8 million Rupees.

On the occasion of the 2nd Islamic Summit held at Lahore on 22 February 1974, thirty-nine heads of Muslim states offered their Friday prayers in the Badshahi Mosque, including, among others, Zulfiqar Ali Bhutto of Pakistan, Faisal of Saudi Arabia, Muammar Gaddafi, Yasser Arafat, and Sabah III Al-Salim Al-Sabah of Kuwait. 
In 1993, the Badshahi Mosque in a tentative list as a UNESCO World Heritage Site. In 2000, the marble inlay in the main prayer hall was repaired. In 2008, replacement work on the red sandstone tiles on the mosque's large courtyard was begun using red sandstone imported from the original Mughal source near Jaipur, in the Indian state of Rajasthan.

Architecture

As a gateway to the west, and Persia in particular, Lahore had a strong regional style which was heavily influenced by Persian architectural styles. Earlier mosques, such as the Wazir Khan Mosque, were adorned in intricate kashi kari, or Kashan style tile work, from which the Badshahi Mosque would depart. Aurangzeb chose an architectural plan similar to that of Shah Jahan's choice for the Jama Masjid in Delhi, though built the Badshahi mosque on a much larger scale. Both mosques feature red sandstone with white marble inlay, which is a departure from typical mosque design in Lahore, in which decoration is done by means of intricate tile work.

Entryway of the complex
Entrance to the mosque complex is via a two-storey edifice built of red sandstone which is elaborately decorated with framed and carved paneling on ea of its facades. The edifice features a muqarna, an architectural feature from the Middle East that was first introduced into Mughal architecture with construction of the nearby and ornate Wazir Khan Mosque.

The mosque's full name "Masjid Abul Zafar Muhy-ud-Din Mohammad Alamgir Badshah Ghazi" is written in inlaid marble above the vaulted entrance. The mosque's gateway faces east towards the Alamgiri Gate of the Lahore Fort, which was also commissioned by Aurangzeb. The massive entrance and mosque are situated on a plinth, which is ascended by a flight of 22 steps at the mosque's main gate which. The gateway itself contains several chambers which are not accessible to the public.

Courtyard
After passing through the massive gate, an expansive sandstone paved courtyard spreads over an area of 276,000 square feet, and which can accommodate 100,000 worshipers when functioning as an Idgah. The courtyard is enclosed by single-aisled arcades.

Prayer hall
The main edifice at the site was also built from red sandstone, and is decorated with white marble inlay. The prayer chamber has a central arched niche with five niches flanking it which are about one third the size of the central niche. The mosque has three marble domes, the largest of which is located in the centre of the mosque, and which is flanked by two smaller domes.

Both the interior and exterior of the mosque are decorated with elaborate white marble carved with a floral design common to Mughal art. The carvings at Badshahi mosque are considered to be uniquely fine and unsurpassed works of Mughal architecture. The chambers on each side of the main chamber contains rooms which were used for religious instruction. The mosque can accommodate 10,000 worshippers in the prayer hall.

Minarets
Each minaret is topped by a marble canopy. The main building of the mosque also features an additional four smaller minarets at each corner of the building.

Location 

The mosque is located adjacent to the Walled City of Lahore, Pakistan. The entrance to the mosque lies on the western side of the rectangular Hazuri Bagh, and faces the famous Alamgiri Gate of the Lahore Fort, which is located on the eastern side of the Hazuri Bagh. The mosque is also located next to the Roshnai Gate, one of the original thirteen gates of Lahore, which is located to the southern side of the Hazuri Bagh.

Near the entrance of the mosque lies the Tomb of Muhammad Iqbal, a poet widely revered in Pakistan as the founder of the Pakistan Movement which led to the creation of Pakistan as a homeland for the Muslims of British India. Also located near the mosque's entrance is the tomb of Sir Sikandar Hayat Khan, who is credited for playing a major role in preservation and restoration of the mosque.

References

Notes

Further reading
Chugtai, M.A., Badshahi Mosque, Lahore: Lahore, 1972.
Gascoigne, Bamber, The Great Mughals, New York: Harper & Row, 1971.
Koch, Ebba, Mughal Architecture, Munich: Prestel-Verlag, 1992.

See also
Tourism in Punjab, Pakistan
Architecture of Lahore
Wazir Khan Mosque
Sheikh Zayed Mosque in Abu Dhabi, whose design was partly inspired by the Badshahi Mosque

External links

Asian Historical Architecture: Badshahi Mosque
UNESCO Tentative Heritage List: Badshahi Mosque

1673 establishments in the Mughal Empire
Mosques completed in 1673
Mosque buildings with domes
Mosques in Lahore
Mughal mosques
Walled City of Lahore
Grand mosques
GNC Multivitamin